The 1996 Campeonato de España de Turismos was won  by Jordi Gene with Audi A4 Quattro; the German manufacturer won the constructors' championship.

Teams and drivers

Race calendar and results

Championship standings

 14 results from 16 are valid for the championship

Drivers' Championship